Pamfilov is a Russian masculine surname, its feminine counterpart is Pamfilova. Notable people with the surname include:

Ella Pamfilova (born 1953), Russian politician
Konstantin Pamfilov (1901–1943), Soviet statesman

Russian-language surnames